Fernando Chui Sai-on  (born 13 January 1957) is a Macau politician who served as the 2nd Chief Executive of Macau from 2009 to 2019. He served as Secretary for Social and Cultural Affairs from 1999 to 2009.

Chui was born in 1957 to local construction tycoon Chui Tak-seng and Chan Keng-fan, the second son after Chui Sai-cheong. His wife is a niece of the late Hong Kong tycoon Henry Fok Ying-tung.

Education
In Macau, Chui attended Lingnan High School and then finished high school at Hawaiian Mission Academy in Honolulu before pursuing his post-secondary education. Chui obtained his university training in the United States where he obtained his various degrees:

 Bachelor's degree in City Hygiene Administration from California State University, Sacramento
 PhD in Public Health at the University of Oklahoma
 Registered member of the American Association of Public Hygiene
 Registered member of the American Association for the Management of Medical Affairs

He was guest professor at the Huanan Teachers Training University.

Due to studying in the United States at a younger age, Chui did not have the opportunity to study Mandarin (Putonghua), and thus does not speak it well. This was evident when he made his oath of acceptance as Chief Executive of Macao in front of Chinese leader Hu Jintao.

Chief Executive of Macau
Prior to becoming Chief Executive, Chui served as a member of the 5th Legislative Assembly of Macau.

In June 2009 Chui was declared to be the sole candidate for the position of Macau's chief executive. He was nominated by 286 members of the 300-member election committee. On election day, 26 July 282 committee members voted for Chui (14 blank, 4 abstention), and was subsequently appointed by Wen Jiabao, Premier of China. He assumed his new role as Chief Executive of Macau in December 2009.

On 31 August 2014, Chui was re-elected as Macau's Chief Executive with 380 votes from the 400-member election committee.  Meanwhile, 7,762 Macau residents voted having no confidence in Chui becoming the Chief Executive in an unofficial "referendum".

List of policy addresses

Election results

Legislative Assembly

Chief Executive

Charities
 Executive manager and director of Medical and Health Department of the Tung Sin Tong Charitable Institution
 President of Macau Jaycees
 Executive Director of Macau Kiang Wu Hospital Charitable Association
 board member of the Macau Eye-Bank Foundation
 Vice President of the Association of the Management Professionals
 Honorary President of the Association of Nursing Staff of Macau

Chui is also involved in youth and education causes including:

 tutor in the Chamber of Commerce for International Youth
 member of the Youth Committee of the Macau Government
 headmaster of the Kiang Ping School
 President of the Youth Association of the Kiang Wu Hospital
 member and Standing Committee member of All-China Youth Federation

Scandals
Chui has been linked to several scandals during his time as a minister of Edmund Ho's administration.

Most notably, the East Asian Games in 2005 were run under Chui's portfolio and put him in the midst of the Ao Man Long scandal. The games ran over budget by 70%. Ao allegedly received a MOP50 million (US$6.2 million) bribe in connection with the construction contract for the games' centerpiece, the Macau Dome indoor arena. Overall, that project wound up costing MOP640 million, MOP285 million over budget. As a result, he was extremely unpopular amongst the pro-democracy camp even before he was elected as the chief executive.
In 2016, Chui was caught up in allegations of transferring Macau's reserves to the mainland. He was accused of favouritism after the Macau Foundation – a quasi-official foundation of which he is chairman and of which his brother heads the supervisory board – donated 100 million yuan ($15.4 million) of public money to Jinan University in Guangzhou, of which he is deputy head of the board. The Macanese government said that the donation was made in return for China's long-standing support to the SAR.

Honours
 Grand-Cross of the Order of Merit, Portugal (9 May 2014)
Grand Lotus Medal of Honour, Macau (19 December 2020)

References

 Information on the major officials and the Procurator-General of the MSAR

1957 births
Living people
People from Xinhui District
Chinese expatriates in the United States
Members of the Legislative Assembly of Macau
Government ministers of Macau
Chief Executives of Macau
Union for Development politicians